Richard Jones (born 1578) was a Welsh politician who sat in the House of Commons  between 1628 and 1640. He supported the Royalist cause in the English Civil War.

Jones was the son or grandson of Griffith Jones of Trewern.

He was elected High Sheriff of Radnorshire for either 1614 or 1617. In 1628 he was elected  Member of Parliament for Radnorshire and held the seat until 1629 when King Charles decided to rule without parliament for eleven years.

In April 1640, Jones was elected MP for Radnor in the Short Parliament. He was a commissioner of array for King Charles in 1642 and issued warrants for raising money for the King's forces. In October 1645 he submitted to parliament and begged to compound on 22 March 1647. His fine was set at £144 on 2 June 1648, but he petitioned that he only had an estate for life in £48 per annum and the fine was reduced to £73. On 27 May 1652 he was exempted and it was ordered that he be left to enjoy his estate.

He married Margaret, the daughter of John Price of Pilleth, who bore him 2 sons, both of whom predeceased him.

References

 

 

1578 births
17th-century deaths
Members of the Parliament of England (pre-1707) for constituencies in Wales
17th-century Welsh politicians
Cavaliers
English MPs 1628–1629
English MPs 1640 (April)
High Sheriffs of Radnorshire